Buchendorf is a village and former municipality in the district of Starnberg in Bavaria, Germany. The village was incorporated into Gauting on 1 January 1978.

References 

Starnberg (district)